Panteleyev, also transliterated as Panteleev is a Russian surname, formed from the Greek name Panteleimon. The feminine form is Panteleyeva or Panteleeva:

Aleksander Panteleyev (1874-1948), Soviet actor and director, Congestion (film)
Denis Panteleyev (born 1982), Russian footballer
Elena Deza, née Panteleeva (born 1961), French–Russian mathematician
Grigorijs Panteļejevs (born 1972), Latvian ice hockey player
Leonid Panteleyev (1908-1987), writer of The Republic of ShKID (film)
Marina Panteleyeva (born 1989), Russian sprinter
Natalya Panteleyeva (born 1983), Russian middle distance runner 
Petko Pantaleev (born 1938), Bulgarian volleyball player
Serafima Panteleeva (1846–1918), Russian feminist, physiologist, author, and translator.
Sergey Panteleev (born 1951), Russian politician
Vladislav Panteleyev (born 1996), Russian footballer
Yuri Aleksandrovich Panteleyev (1901-1983), Soviet naval officer
Yuri Panteleyev (born 1999), Russian footballer

See also
Russian destroyer Admiral Panteleyev

Russian-language surnames
Patronymic surnames
Surnames from given names